Mig Macario is a Filipino-American and Filipino-Canadian actor. He is best known for playing Bashful of the Seven Dwarfs on the ABC series Once Upon a Time. He has also starred in the Dan Gilroy film Velvet Buzzsaw with Jake Gyllenhaal, and has recurring roles on Ruby Herring Mysteries, Sanctuary and The Troop. Mig has also been featured in many national commercial campaigns for clients such as Lexus, Doritos, DirectTV, Bubly and UberEats.

Biography
Mig was named after the Filipino revolutionary general, and actor Macario Sakay. He was born in the Philippines, grew up in Vancouver, Canada, and is now based in Los Angeles, California. Macario is a practicing Nichiren Buddhist with the Soka Gakkai.

Early in his career, Macario played petty criminal characters in shows like 21 Jump Street, Wiseguy, and The Commish. Macario broke out from these roles when he played the lead role of Song Liling, in the Tony Award-winning play M. Butterfly at the Arts Club Theatre. Macario's performance earned him a Jessie Richardson Theatre Award nomination for best newcomer. His producing, writing and directing debut was on the highly rated Summer Love - The Documentary, which explored rave culture and aired on Much Music.

Macario has appeared in over 50 film and television projects; working with artists such as Jake Gyllenhaal, Toni Collette, John Malkovich, Rene Russo, Daveed Diggs, Ginnifer Goodwin, Taylor Cole, Jennifer Morrison, Johnny Depp, Maury Chaykin, Paul Sorvino, Dean McDermott and Jenny McCarthy. He plays the iconic Disney character Bashful of the 7 dwarfs on the hit ABC series Once Upon a Time. Macario has had roles on the Gemini Award-winning, dark comedy Less Than Kind, Level Up,  Sanctuary, FRINGE for Fox and Nickelodeon's The Troop.

Selected filmography

References

External links

Official Website

1970 births
Living people
Canadian male film actors
American male film actors
Male actors from Vancouver
Canadian male television actors
American male television actors
Canadian male actors of Filipino descent
American male actors of Filipino descent
People from Quezon